Social osmosis is the indirect infusion of social or cultural knowledge. Effectively, social content is diffused, and by happenstance authentic experience is displaced by degrees of mediated separation before a subject acquires knowledge of a social phenomenon.

An example of social osmosis would be knowing a show exists and possessing detailed information concerning aspects of the show, such as the characters' stage names and the names of the cast, without actively acquiring this knowledge by watching the show.

Sources
 Raaj K. Sah, "Social Osmosis And Patterns Of Crime". Published in The Journal of Political Economy, Vol. 99, No. 6. (December 1991), pp. 1272–1295.
 "Indoctrination as a normative conception" Studies in Philosophy and Education  Volume 4, Number 4 / December, 1966
 Social Osmosis: Refugees in Hong Kong AD Barnett, 1953
 "Reverse Social Osmosis in Uttar Pradesh" Economic and Political Weekly, 2007 (epw.org.in)

Sociology of culture